is a Japanese politician from the Constitutional Democratic Party of Japan, and served as the Vice Speaker of the House of Representatives of Japan from 2017 to 2021.

Life and career 

A native of Nagoya and graduate of Waseda University, he was elected to the first of his three terms in the Aichi Prefectural Assembly and then to the House of Representatives for the first time in 1990 as a member of the Japan Socialist Party.

He was appointed Minister of Agriculture in 2009. In April 2010, he skipped the traditional visit by legislators to Ise Jingu, opting instead to take a holiday in Mexico with his wife. While he was on vacation, Japan suffered a large outbreak of foot-and-mouth disease. His response to the outbreak was widely criticized and the Ministry of Agriculture apologized on his behalf on May 31. The Hatoyama government collapsed in June and Akamatsu was not reappointed.

Akamatsu is the current Vice Speaker of the House of Representatives. He was also previously Vice Speaker between 2012 and 2014.

References

External links 
 Official website in Japanese.

Members of the House of Representatives from Aichi Prefecture
Members of the Aichi Prefectural Assembly
Living people
1956 births
People from Nagoya
Constitutional Democratic Party of Japan politicians
Democratic Party of Japan politicians
Social Democratic Party (Japan) politicians
Ministers of Agriculture, Forestry and Fisheries of Japan
Waseda University alumni
21st-century Japanese politicians